Edward, Ed, or Eddie Chambers is the name of:

Edward T. Chambers (1930–2015), executive director of the Industrial Areas Foundation
Edward R. Chambers (1795–1872), American politician from Virginia
Eddie Chambers (born 1982), American boxer
Eddie Chambers (artist) (born 1960), British artist
Edward Chambers (footballer), see 2004–05 Hong Kong First Division League
Edward Chambers (MP) for Calne